X/The Name Of The Rose is a compilation album released by the hard rock band Ten. The double compact disc contains the debut Ten studio album X originally released in 1996 and the band's second album The Name of the Rose, along with a number of bonus tracks, which were only available on the band's Japanese exclusive EP, The Name of the Rose.

Track listing
All songs written by Gary Hughes except where noted.

Disc one-X

 The Crusades/It's All About Love" – 8:07 (Hughes/Vinny Burns)
 After the Love Has Gone" – 5:27
 Yesterday Lies In the Flames" – 5:06
 The Torch" – 5:25
 Stay With Me" – 5:52
 Close Your Eyes and Dream" – 6:24
 Eyes of a Child" – 5:02
 Can't Slow Down" – 5:29
 Lamb to the Slaughter" – 4:50
 Soliloquy/The Loneliest Place In the World" – 10:28
 When Only Love Can Ease the Pain" – 5:07
 After the Love Has Gone" (Live version) – 5:21
 Can't Slow Down" (Live version) – 6:17

Disc two-"The Name Of The Rose"

 The Name of the Rose" – 8:31
 Wildest Dreams" – 5:33
 Don't Cry" – 5:00
 Turn Around" – 3:52
 Pharaoh's Prelude: Ascension to the Afterlife" – 3:54
 Wait For You" – 5:31
 The Rainbow" – 6:03 (G. Hughes/Zoe Hughes)
 Through the Fire" – 8:19
 Goodnight Saigon" – 7:02
 Wings of the Storm" – 5:02
 Standing In Your Light" – 7:18
 The Quest" – 4:52
 You're My Religion" – 6:48

Personnel

X
Gary Hughes – vocals and programming
Vinny Burns – guitars and programming
Greg Morgan – drums and percussion
 Mark Harrison – bass guitar
 Lee Goulding – keyboards
 Howard Smith – keyboards
 Andy Thompson – keyboards
 Francis Cummings – first violin
 Peter Leighton-Jones – first violin
 John Wade – first violin
 Fiona Payne – second violin
 Julia Parsons – second violin
 Jean Ambrose – viola
 Anne Morrison – viola
 Anna Frazer – cello

The Name Of The Rose
Gary Hughes – vocals and programming
Vinny Burns – guitars and programming
Ged Rylands – keyboards
 Martin "Shelley" Shelton – bass guitar
Greg Morgan – drums and percussion
 Mark Harrison – bass guitar
 Brian Cox – keyboards
 Howard Smith – keyboards
 Andy Thompson – keyboards
 Jason Thanos – backing vocals (Track 9)
 Oliver Bowden – backing vocals (Track 11)
 Thierey Cardinet – backing vocals (Track 11)
 Damien Guasp – backing vocals (Track 11)
 Jee Jacquet – backing vocals (Track 11)

Production
Mixing – Mike Stone
Engineer – Mike Stone, Audu Obaje and Ray Brophy
Executive Producers – Mark Ashton and Vinny Burns

References

Ten (band) albums
1999 compilation albums
Albums produced by Gary Hughes
Frontiers Records compilation albums